This article displays a list of Iraqi Premier League hat-tricks. The goals scored represent players who have scored three goals (a hat-trick) or more in a single league match in Iraq's top football division since its first edition in 1974.

Notable events
 The first hat-trick was scored by Thamer Yousif for Al-Naqil in a win over Al-Shorta on 12 October 1974.
 Thamer Yousif is the first player to score five goals in Al-Naqil's win over Al-Shorta on 12 October 1974.
 Shakir Mohammed Sabbar is the first player to score six goals in Al-Ramadi's win over Kirkuk on 15 May 1995.
 The Cameroonian player Jean Michel N'Lend is the first non-Iraqi player to score a hat-trick in Al-Shorta's win over Al-Quwa Al-Jawiya on 18 November 2012.
 Al-Zawraa is the club with the most hat-tricks scored by its players with a total of 48.
 Sahib Abbas and Qahtan Chathir have scored the most hat-tricks, with ten.

Hat-tricks

Source

Statistics

Hat-tricks by player
The following table lists the players who scored five or more hat-tricks.

Hat-tricks by nationality
The following table lists the number of hat-tricks scored by players from a single nation.

Hat-tricks by club
The following table lists the clubs whose players have scored ten or more hat-tricks.

References

Iraqi Premier League
Iraqi Premier League